Ribsy is a children's book by Beverly Cleary. It is the sixth and final book in the Henry Huggins series. Henry plays a minor role in the story, however, as the narrative focuses primarily on his dog, Ribsy.

Plot
Like most of the Henry Huggins books, the incidents in this book follow an ongoing plot line. In it, the Hugginses have a new car, and go out shopping; Ribsy, denied a ride, chases it at up to 25 miles per hour, and is finally allowed in. At the mall, he is left in the car, and he lowers the electric window with the button. He eventually wants to return to await Henry, and gets into the first new-smelling car he finds. But a different family, with several daughters and a son, gets in and takes him home with them. He endures a bubble bath and escapes, wandering in search of Henry.

Ribsy finds an old lady named Mrs. Frawley who told  him to go away when he raises his paw in greeting and she invites him in. After she feeds him dinner, he sleeps while she goes out to shop for her new pet. He chafes at a coat and colorful leash, then escapes. Soon after, he finds himself becoming the unofficial mascot for a class of elementary school students until he is kicked out over an incident with a squirrel.

Later, Ribsy sneaks into a high school football game, wanders onto the field, and makes the game-winning tackle. He is caught by a boy who, pleased at the attention he gets for people thinking it was his dog who won the game, takes him in. The story of the game gains the attention of the Hugginses, who attempt to retrieve him. However, he escapes again after hearing Henry's voice on the phone and runs off in search of him.

Later, Ribsy is found by a boy with a tennis ball who lives in an apartment building. He decides to adopt him, but panics when confronted by his landlady and hides him on a fire escape where he is spotted by the Hugginses as they drive through the neighborhood in search of him. Mr. Huggins manages to retrieve him with the help of some nearby workmen and he is happily reunited with Henry. They offer the boy, whose name is Larry, a portion of the reward and help him deal with his landlady before getting back in their car where Ribsy sits beside Henry as they drive home, finally reunited.

External links
 Chapter 1 at harperchildrens.com

Novels by Beverly Cleary
Novels set in Portland, Oregon
1964 American novels
William Morrow and Company books
Children's novels about animals
1964 children's books